The English county of Northamptonshire has several places within its boundaries with Ashby as part of their name; these include:

 Ashby St Ledgers
 Canons Ashby
 Castle Ashby
 Cold Ashby
 Mears Ashby